Dale Singleton (August 27, 1955 in Dalton, Georgia – September 1, 1985 in South Carolina) was an American professional motorcycle racer.

Singleton competed at the 1979 Suzuka 8 Hours.  Singleton won the Daytona 200 in 1979 and 1981 – both for privateer teams.  Also in 1981 he won the AMA Road Racing Championship.

He was killed in a plane crash in 1985.

Singleton was inducted into the AMA Motorcycle Hall of Fame in 2002.

References

1955 births
1985 deaths
People from Dalton, Georgia
American motorcycle racers
500cc World Championship riders
Accidental deaths in South Carolina
Victims of aviation accidents or incidents in the United States
Victims of aviation accidents or incidents in 1985